A kaliapparat is a laboratory device invented in 1831 by Justus von Liebig (1803–1873) for the analysis of carbon in organic compounds. The device, made of glass, consists of a series of five bulbs connected and arranged in a triangular shape.

To determine the carbon in an organic compound with a kaliapparat, the substance is first burned, converting any carbon present into carbon dioxide (CO2). The gaseous products along with the water vapor produced by combustion are passed through the kaliapparat, which is filled with a potassium hydroxide (KOH) solution. The potassium hydroxide reacts with the CO2 to trap it as potassium carbonate. The global reaction, ignoring intermediate steps and the corresponding ionic dissociation, can be written as follows:

2 KOH + CO2 → K2CO3  +  H2O.

Subtracting the mass of the kaliapparat before the combustion from that measured after the combustion gives the amount of CO2 absorbed. From the mass of CO2 thus determined, standard stoichiometric calculations then give the mass of carbon in the original sample.

A stylized symbol of a kaliapparat is used in the American Chemical Society logo since 1909, originally designed in the early 20th century by Tiffany's Jewelers.

See also 
 CHN analyzer
 Combustion analysis
 Dumas method of molecular weight determination
 Elemental analysis
 Total organic carbon

References

Further reading

  See especially pages 36 – 41 and 58 – 66.

External links 

 
 
  – The American Chemical Society's logo contains a kaliapparat.

1831 in Germany
1831 in science
Analytical chemistry
Elemental analysis
German inventions
Justus von Liebig
Laboratory equipment
Organic chemistry